Cobalt(II) oxalate is the inorganic compound with the formula of CoC2O4.  Like other simple inorganic oxalates, it is a coordination polymer.  The oxalate ligands bridge of Co(OH2)2 centres. Each cobalt adopts octahedral coordination geometry.

It is used in the preparation of cobalt catalysts, and cobalt metal powder for powder-metallurgical applications. It is made in process of recycling lithium-ion batteries, where the cobalt is obtained from cathode material (LiCoO2) by leaching with sulfuric acid and then precipitated with ammonium oxalate.

Related compounds
Many cobalt(III) oxalate complexes are known, including [Co(C2O4)3]3- and [Co(C2H4(NH2)2)C2O4)2]−.

References

Cobalt(II) compounds
Oxalates